The Touch is a 2002 Hong Kong action/adventure martial arts film directed by Crouching Tiger Hidden Dragon cinematographer Peter Pau and starring Michelle Yeoh, Ben Chaplin and Richard Roxburgh. It was produced by China Film Co-production Corporation, Han Entertainment, Mythical Films, Aruze, Pandasia Entertainment and Tianjan Studios.

Apart from special effects sequences shot in sound stages, the film was shot on-location in Nepal and China. Some of the mountain ranges in which the film was shot were not open to filmmakers earlier.

Gala Film Distribution handled the distribution in Hong Kong and Solar Pictures in the Philippines for a 2002 theatrical release. Miramax also bought the rights to the film in 2002, removing 20 minutes of footage for a 83-minute  version for 2003 and 2004 US theatrical releases, and completed the special effects CGI scenes. The theatrical release was shelved and instead was released via Netflix and Aol On network; it was released on DVD in 2009.

The film had a 2005 theatrical release in Japan by Nikkatsu and in Argentina by Buena Vista International. The DVD was released in 2003 to 2005 in various European countries, including Germany, the Netherlands, Spain, and Russia.

Plot
The Touch tells the story of a Chinese family of martial artists and acrobats who have been performing for many generations. The family are, in secret, guardians of a holy treasure accessible only by a spectacular jump which, to everyone else, is impossible to perform.

One of the family members (the main character's brother) and his girlfriend are kidnapped by a ruthless treasure hunter (Roxburgh) to procure the priceless relic for him. Yeoh's character Pak Yin, with the help of Eric (Chaplin), her master thief ex-boyfriend, pursues them into an ancient desert where legends say the treasure is buried in order to uncover and protect the treasure that her ancestors had sworn to keep safe. The action culminates in a climactic sequence set in the booby trapped subterranean Buddhist temple.

Cast 

 Michelle Yeoh
 Ben Chaplin
 Richard Roxburgh
 Kenneth Tsang

Reception
The film was generally panned by critics for its clichéd storyline, overuse of English, and the sub-par visual effects in the original theatrical release before Miramax completed them for the 83-minute version now found on DVD.

External links and references

Specific

2002 films
2002 martial arts films
Taiwanese martial arts films
Hong Kong martial arts films
Films scored by Basil Poledouris
Films shot in China
Films shot in Nepal
2000s English-language films
2000s Hong Kong films